Noel Sean (born 28 November 1982), is an Indian rapper and actor working in the Telugu cinema and Telugu music. Well known as the first rapper of in Telugu Music Industry and Tollywood as well as a versatile actor, music producer, television host, Radio Jockey, lyricist and composer. In 2020, He participated in a Telugu reality TV show Bigg Boss 4 as contestant.

Early and personal life
Sean was born on 28 November 1982 in Hyderabad to Samuel and Sarah.He has 3 siblings. Sean went on to pursue the Bachelor of Fine arts in SVCFA and became a web designer successfully. He worked for Cognizant as a trainee until he joined the film industry.

Career
While he was still studying, Sean had met a famous archery coach Pallela Ravishankar who encouraged and guided him into the film industry where he introduced Sean to Ramanand who worked as the casting director for Teja (film director). It is then that he made his first appearance on screen in the Telugu Film, 'Sambhavami Yuge Yuge' during which he met Krishna (director) who later introduced Sean to the legendary music director M. M. Keeravani who gave him the first break as a Rapping in the Telugu movie 'Vikramarkudu' directed by the ace director S. S. Rajamouli.

This brought Sean huge recognition, thus marking his title as the 'First Telugu Rapper' after which there was no looking back. In 2007, he did his first on screen appearance along with Charmy Kaur in the movie 'Mantra' for the famous number 'Maha Maha'. During the same period, Sean also got into Radio Jockeying for 93.5 Red FM and gained a lot of fan following. He then consecutively appeared in various notable roles in several big projects and established himself as a versatile actor in Telugu filmdom.

It was in 2015, that tables turned around for Sean as an actor, when he was signed for the movie 'Kumari 21F under Director Sukumar's production in which he played the role of Shankar, the antagonist. His performance in the movie was applauded for both by the critics as well as the audience. He soon debuted as a lead actor (Hero) in the film Naanna Nenu Naa Boyfriends opposite Hebah Patel. The movie did well and added yet another feather on his hat. In 2020 Sean Participated in the Telugu reality TV show Bigg Boss 4 hosted by Nagarjuna Akkineni.

Music 
Sean has produced several independent songs and released them on his official YouTube channel. He has also established a Telugu Band named 'THE SHAKE GROUP' along with the very famous lyricist Ananta Sriram. Singers Ramya Behara, Mohana, Damini, Mounima, Adire Abhi, Aditya and Arun are also a part of this band. His latest video Despacito Telugu Cover along with Ester Noronha went viral and crossed 1 million views in less than 2 weeks. He also entered the Konkani music industry as a rapper through Despacito Konkani Cover version by Ester Noronha.

Filmography

* All films are in Telugu, otherwise mentioned

Television

Discography

Film songs

Jai Simha - 2018 (Telugu)
O Manasa - 2016 (Telugu)
Krishnashtami - 2016 (Telugu)
Rey - 2015 (Telugu)
Disco - 2012 (Telugu)
Poola Rangadu - 2012 (Telugu)
All The Best - 2012 (Telugu)
Lovely - 2012 (Telugu)
Vykuntapali - 2011 (Telugu)
Babloo - 2011 (Telugu)
Aha Naa Pellanta - 2011 (Telugu)
Andari Bhanduvayya - 2010 (Telugu)
Rama Rama Krishna Krishna - 2010 (Telugu)
Seetharamula Kalyanam - 2010 (Telugu)
Ooha Chitram  - 2009 (Telugu)
Life Style - 2009 (Telugu)
Indumathi - 2009 (Telugu)
Kadhalna Summa Illai - 2009 (Tamil)
Premabhishekam - 2008 (Telugu)
Krishnarjuna - 2008 (Telugu)
Vishaka Express - 2008 (Telugu)
Andamaina Manasulo - 2008 (Telugu)
Victory - 2008 (Telugu)
Mantra - 2007 (Telugu)
Vikramarkudu - 2006 (Telugu)

Non-film songs

References

External links

Living people
Place of birth missing (living people)
Bigg Boss (Telugu TV series) contestants
Indian male playback singers
Indian male television actors
Male actors from Hyderabad, India
Telugu playback singers
Telugu male actors
Male actors in Telugu cinema
Telugu television anchors
Indian male film actors
21st-century Indian male singers
21st-century Indian singers
21st-century Indian male actors
1982 births